William of (Guillaume de Chartres, Guillielmus de Carnoto, Willemus de Carnoto; c. 1178 – 1218) was the grand master of the Knights Templar from 1210 until 26 August 1218.

He was the son of Milo IV, the Count of Bar-sur-Seine.

In 1210, William assisted at the coronation of Jean de Brienne as King of Jerusalem. In 1211, he arbitrated between Leo I of Armenia and the Templars, regarding the castle of Bagras. During the Reconquista, he sent needed supplies and reinforcements to the Christian armies. He sent Templars to fight in the Battle of Las Navas de Tolosa and in the 1217 Siege of Alcázar, leading to the order flourishing in Spain, achieving its zenith of influence in the area.  He had contact with the Mongols under Genghis Khan and was accused of treason as a result.

When the Fifth Crusade started in 1217, William led his men in battle, beginning with the Crusaders launching a siege of the Egyptian city of Damietta. The siege lasted eighteen months, with multiple failed assaults on the city and in fighting among crusader leadership spelling disaster for their goals. Muslim enforcements were also in route to Damiette, but William led the Templars in successfully repelling them. Although the Crusaders were eventually successful in taking the city, William died in 1218 of pestilence, (possibly endemic typhus), as a consequence of being wounded.

References

Sources 
 
 

1170s births
1218 deaths
Grand Masters of the Knights Templar
Christians of the Fifth Crusade
Year of birth unknown
People from Aube
13th-century French people
Deaths from typhus